Jordi Alejandro Vilasuso (born June 15, 1981 in Miami, Florida) is a Cuban-American actor best known for originating the role of Tony Santos on the CBS soap opera Guiding Light from August 2000 until August 2003. He has also portrayed the roles of Griffin Castillo on All My Children from 2010 to 2011 and 2013, Dario Hernandez on Days of Our Lives from 2016 to 2017 and Rey Rosales on The Young and the Restless from 2018 to 2022.

Early life
Vilasuso was raised by his parents, Dr. Frank Vilasuso and Ana Vilasuso, in Coral Gables, Florida. He also has an older brother, Javier, and a younger sister, Marianne. Vilasuso attended Ransom Everglades High School and later Glendale Community College in California.

Career
Vilasuso began playing Tony Santos on Guiding Light in August 2000. In 2003, he won the Daytime Emmy Award for Outstanding Younger Actor in a Drama Series for his portrayal. Vilasuso was also nominated in the same category in 2002.

Vilasuso has appeared in the movies The Last Home Run, The Lost City, Heights and La Linea. He also appeared in other television programs such as 8 Simple Rules, Buffy the Vampire Slayer, Numb3rs and  CSI: Miami. In November 2010 he was signed on to play the contract role of Griffin Castillo on the soap opera All My Children. Vilasuso joined the cast of Days of Our Lives as Dario Hernandez in 2015. In July 2017, Vilasuso announced his departure from Days of Our Lives.
In July 2018, it was announced that Vilasuso would appear as Rey Rosales on the daytime soap opera The Young and The Restless. In March 2022, Vilasuso announced his departure from The Young and the Restless.

Personal life 
In 2010, Vilasuso began dating actress Kaitlin Riley. Vilasuso and Riley were married on August 25, 2012 in Islamorada, Florida. They have two daughters: Riley Grace, born on November 26, 2012, and Everly Maeve born on July 15, 2016.

 
On April 9, 2020, he revealed that his family had mild cases of COVID-19 and have fully recovered.

Filmography

References

External links

1981 births
American male soap opera actors
Living people
American people of Cuban descent
American people of Catalan descent
Cuban people of Catalan descent
Male actors from Miami
Actors from Coral Gables, Florida
Daytime Emmy Award winners
Daytime Emmy Award for Outstanding Younger Actor in a Drama Series winners